Julie Kepp Jensen (born 3 January 2000) is a Danish swimmer. She competed in the women's 4 × 100m freestyle relay event at the 2016 Summer Olympics where she placed 12th. She competed in the 2020 Summer Olympics and placed 8th in the same event, and also competed in the women's 50m freestyle event.

References

External links
 

2000 births
Living people
Danish female swimmers
Olympic swimmers of Denmark
Swimmers at the 2015 European Games
Swimmers at the 2016 Summer Olympics
Danish female freestyle swimmers
European Aquatics Championships medalists in swimming
European Games medalists in swimming
European Games bronze medalists for Denmark
Swimmers at the 2020 Summer Olympics
Swimmers from Copenhagen
21st-century Danish women